James Vernon Herring (January 7, 1887 – May 29, 1969) was an African-American artist and professor of art at Howard University.

James V. Herring founded the Howard University Department of Art in 1922. In 1943 along with Alonzo J. Aden he opened the Barnett-Aden Gallery in Washington, DC. The gallery was the first black privately owned and operated art gallery in the United States and was located at 127 Randolph Street, NW. In an effort to fight segregation, both black and white artists were exhibited at the gallery. The gallery served as a place to meet for those interested in art, including curators from the Phillips Collection, Corcoran Gallery of Art, and the National Gallery of Art.

Herring and Aden also worked together on the Gallery of Art at Howard. Herring founded it in 1930 and Aden served as the first curator.

Herring retired from Howard in 1953.

References

 Biography.

External links
 "Being But Men, We Walked Into the Trees", February 11, 2016.

1887 births
1969 deaths
20th-century American painters
American male painters
Howard University faculty
20th-century African-American painters
20th-century American male artists